General elections were held in Barbados on 3 November 1966. This election was the last contested using two-member constituencies, in which each voter had two votes. The result was a victory for the Democratic Labour Party, which won 14 of the 24 seats. This was the last election contested by the Barbados National Party (BNP, also known as the Conservatives). Once a powerful force in Barbados politics, the party stood only four candidates and was reduced to two seats; the BNP formally disbanded in 1970.  Voter turnout was 79.7%.

This was the last election before Barbados gained its formal independence from Britain on 30 November 1966. On 18 November, in anticipation of independence, the title of the Premier was changed to Prime Minister.

Results

References

Barbados
1966 in Barbados
Elections in Barbados
November 1966 events in North America